This is a list of flags used exclusively in Wales.

National flags

Royal standards of the United Kingdom

Government flags

Religious

Dioceses of the Church in Wales

Historical

Welsh flags

Welsh royal standards

Battle flags

Religious flags

Regions, counties and cities

Traditional counties
Of the 13 historic counties, seven have flags registered with the Flag Institute, with Brecknockshire, Cardiganshire (now Ceredigion), Carmarthenshire, Denbighshire, Montgomeryshire and Radnorshire outstanding.

Cities, towns and villages

University flags

Nationalist flags

References

Flags of Wales
Wales
Flags